N-56 is an independent Scottish business pressure group established by Dan Macdonald in 2014. N-56 aims to provide a new locus for Scotland's business community to work with government and others to ensure Scotland attains a position among the top five advanced economies in the world.

N-56 derives its name from Scotland's coordinates. The World Atlas Latitude & Longitude coordinates of Scotland are 56.49067119999999 N, 4.2026458000000275 W.

N-56 launched its main analysis report, Scotland Means Business, in June 2014. The report was published as two documents: the FACTS and the STRATEGY. It was prepared over 15 months by a research team that included BiGGAR ECONOMICS, Tulloch Energy, Capital Economics, Landfall Strategy Group and Damvad.
Throughout 2014 N-56 will launch a series of sector-specific reports examining the Scottish economy and its future direction in the areas of infrastructure, financial services and oil and gas.

References

External links 
 

Political advocacy groups in Scotland
2014 Scottish independence referendum
2014 establishments in Scotland
Organizations established in 2014